Velký Špičák ( or Schmiedeberger Spitzberg) is a 965 m high mountain in the  Czech part of the Ore Mountains of Central Europe.

Mountains and hills of the Czech Republic
Mountains of the Ore Mountains
Mountains under 1000 metres